Markus Carr (born in Sun Valley, Los Angeles, California), also known as M. Carr, is an American basketball player who played in several European countries and South America (France, Venezuela, Poland, Bosnia, and Hungary). Most recently, Carr has played three seasons for the BC Vienna in Liga.1 Austria (2009–2012). In the season 2014/15 he played for the "Raiders Villach" Liga.2. Carinthia, both of the Austrian Basketball Bundesliga.

College / Professional basketball career
Carr had a college basketball career where he averaged 16.0 points per game his senior year at Cal State Northridge in 2002. In his third season at Cal State Northridge, Carr led the Big Sky Conference as well as the Nation in Assist with 8.9 assist per game.  Carr is the Cal State Northridge all-time leader in Assist and Steals in the history of the program.

Achievements 
 2014 Cal State Northridge University Athletic "Hall of Fame" Inductee
 2012 Austrian All Star Basketball Team Selection
1998 – 2002 
 NCAA: Led the Big Sky Conference and the entire Nation in  "Assist"  with 8.9 assist per game.
 Set Big West record in Steals with 11 steals in a single game
 Set new CSUN Basketball record for most consecutive Free-Throws made with 32 in a row
 CSUN Men's Basketball  All-Time leader Assist & Steals
 Three time All League Selection from (Big Sky & Big West 1999–2002)

References

External links
 Markus Carr — Player profile at Basketpedya.com

Living people
1979 births
American expatriate basketball people in France
American expatriate basketball people in Hungary
American expatriate basketball people in Poland
American expatriate basketball people in Venezuela
Basketball players from California
Cal State Northridge Matadors men's basketball players
Guaiqueríes de Margarita players
Point guards
People from Sun Valley, Los Angeles
American men's basketball players